The third USS Josephine (SP-3295) was a United States Navy patrol vessel in commission from 1918 to 1919.

Josephine was built as a civilian motorboat of the same name in 1913 by Jacob Shipyard at City Island in the Bronx, New York. The U.S. Navy acquired her from her owner, Frank L. Sample Sr., on 30 October 1918 for World War I service as a patrol vessel. She was commissioned as USS Josephine (SP-3295).

Assigned to the 3rd Naval District, Josephine served on the section patrol as a patrol and harbor craft in the New York City area. World War I ended on 11 November 1918, twelve days after the Navy acquired Josephine, but she remained in service for a short time after the war before being decommissioned.

The Navy returned Josephine to Sample on 3 January 1919.

Josephine should not be confused with two other patrol vessels, USS Josephine (SP-913) and USS Josephine (SP-1243), which also were in commission in the U.S. Navy during World War I.

References
 
 Department of the Navy: Navy History and Heritage Command: Online Library of Selected Images: Civilian Ships: Josephine (Motor Boat, 1913); Later USS Josephine (SP-3295), 1918-1919
 NavSource Online: Section Patrol Craft Photo Archive: Josephine (SP 913)

Patrol vessels of the United States Navy
World War I patrol vessels of the United States
World War I auxiliary ships of the United States
Ships built in City Island, Bronx
1913 ships